Vystrkov is a municipality and village in Pelhřimov District in the Vysočina Region of the Czech Republic. It has about 300 inhabitants.

Notable people
Josef Kořenář (born 1998), ice hockey player

References

Villages in Pelhřimov District